Khubeza patties are fried patties made of khubeza, a variety of a mallow native to the Levant region) combined with bulgur, pita crumbs, eggs, spices, garlic and onions.

History
During the siege of Jerusalem, when convoys of food could not reach the city, residents of Jerusalem went out to the fields to pick khubeza, a wild green which is high in iron and vitamins. The Jerusalem radio station Kol Hamagen broadcast instructions for cooking it. The broadcast, picked up in Jordan, convinced the Arabs that the Jews were dying of starvation and that victory was at hand. 

Food writers in Israel have encouraged the population to prepare khubeza on Israel Independence Day.

Variations
Jew's mallow (molokhia) leaves can be used instead of khubeza.

See also
Israeli cuisine

References

Israeli cuisine
Culture of Jerusalem